Mannargudi railway station is a railway station in Tiruvarur district serving the town of Mannargudi in Tamil Nadu, India. Neighbourhood stations are Koradacheri, Nidamangalam. The station code for Mannargudi railway station is MQ.

The railway station is located off the JN St, Mannai Nagar of Mannargudi. The nearest bus depot is located in Mannargudi while the nearest airport is situated 86 kilometres (53 mi) away in Tiruchirappalli.

Electrification works are ongoing and expected to be completed by March 2021

Location
The railway station is located off the JN St, Mannai Nagar of Mannargudi.

Lines

Important trains

List of some important train which originate/ Terminates at Mannargudi railway station

References

Trichy railway division
Railway stations in Thiruvarur district
Transport in Mannargudi